The 2018 season is Bunyodkor's 12th season in the Uzbek League.

Squad

Transfers

Winter

In:

Out:

Summer

In:

Out:

Competitions

Uzbek League

Regular season

League table

Results summary

Results by round

Results

Championship Round

League table

Results summary

Results by round

Results

Uzbek Cup

Squad statistics

Appearances and goals

|-
|colspan="14"|Players who left Bunyodkor during the season:
|}

Goal scorers

Disciplinary Record

References

Sport in Tashkent
FC Bunyodkor seasons
Bunyodkor